Penicillium cairnsense is a fungus species of the genus of Penicillium which produces benzomalvins, citreoviridin, phoenicin, terrain, quinolactacin and decaturin. Penicillium cairnsense is named after Cairns, a city in Australia that is near to where this species was first isolated.

See also
List of Penicillium species

References 

cairnsense
Fungi described in 2011